Kallum Kaniyagum is a 1968 Indian Tamil-language film, directed by K. Shankar and produced by T. M. Soundararajan and A. L. Raghavan. The film stars T. M. Soundararajan, Rajasree, A. L. Raghavan and M. N. Rajam.

Plot

Cast

T. M. Soundararajan
Rajasree
A. L. Raghavan
M. N. Rajam
Nagesh
Sachu
Kallapart Natarajan
Typist Gopu
Friend Ramasamy
Master Prabhakar
Kanagaraj
Mohan
Sethupathi
Usilaimani
Rajeswari
S. N. Lakshmi
Chandra
Sarala
Baby Raji
Vijayakumari in guest appearance
S. V. Sahasranamam in guest appearance

Soundtrack
The music was composed by M. S. Viswanathan.

References

External links 
 

1960s Tamil-language films
1968 films
Films directed by K. Shankar
Films scored by M. S. Viswanathan